Alexander Munro may refer to:
Alexander Munro of Bearcrofts (died 1704), Scottish soldier and politician
Alexander Munro (sculptor) (1825–1871), Pre-Raphaelite sculptor
Alexander Munro (athlete) (1870–1934), British Olympic medal winner
Alex Munro (comedian) (1911–1986), Scottish actor and comedian
Alex Munro (footballer, born 1912) (1912–1986), Scottish footballer
Alex Munro (footballer, born 1944) (1944–2009), Scottish footballer
Alex Munro, a character in Star Trek: Voyager – Elite Force

See also 
Alexander Monro (disambiguation)